Judge Daniel Sherman (October 14, 1721 in Connecticut – July 28, 1799) was an American state legislator and judge from Connecticut. He sat in the Connecticut General Assembly for 30 years.

Personal life
Sherman married Mindwell Taylor on February 14, 1744, in Danbury, Fairfield County, Connecticut. Born on September 5, 1758, their son was the Judge Taylor Sherman, who was a lawyer and judge in Norwalk, Connecticut.

Legacy
Sherman had many prominent descendants, including:
 his son, judge Taylor Sherman;
 Ohio Supreme Court judge Charles Robert Sherman, who was his grandson;
 United States Senator John Sherman, United States Civil War general William Tecumseh Sherman, Federal judge Charles Taylor Sherman, and businessman Hoyt Sherman, all of whom were his great-grandsons;
 Jesuit priest Thomas Ewing Sherman, a great-great-grandson.

References

1721 births
Year of death missing
Members of the Connecticut House of Representatives
People of colonial Connecticut
People from Fairfield County, Connecticut
Connecticut state court judges